Handley–Ederville Road is a short arterial road located in the cities of Fort Worth and Richland Hills, in the northeastern region of Tarrant County, in the U.S. state of Texas. The portion of the highway that travels from an intersection with Texas State Highway 121 (SH 121) to Midway Road is maintained by the Texas Department of Transportation (TxDOT), as part of the unsigned Principle Arterial Street System, or PASS. The first section of the road existed by at least 1954, and the entire route existed by 1968.

Route description
Handley–Ederville Road begins at its southern terminus, an intersection with Brentwood Stair Road, as an undivided, four-lane paved road. The highway proceeds north, passing over several exit ramps from Interstate 30 (I-30), in the process intersecting ramps coming to and from eastbound I-30. The roadway continues north, intersecting a small road that provides access to and from westbound I-30, and making a large S-curve past several small buildings and businesses. The road continues northeast, passing several small neighborhoods, and making a large curve northwest past several more neighborhoods. The route continues northwest, intersecting Randol Mill Road, and passing over the west fork of the Trinity River, and proceeding northward. The highway continues north, passing several large buildings, before intersecting Midway Road, where state maintenance begins.

Handley–Ederville Road continues northward, passing several more businesses, before reaching an interchange with SH 121, where state maintenance ends, and continuing north past a small neighborhood and additional businesses. The highway passes a few more small businesses, before reaching its northern terminus, an intersection with SH 183.

History
By at least 1954, a short, unnamed, unimproved dirt road existed between SH 183 and Randol Mill Road, near the present location of Handley–Ederville Road. In 1957, this stretch was improved to a gravel surface, and was given route's present name. By at least five years later, a Y intersection had been constructed at the intersection with Randol Mill. Between 1962 and 1965, minor rerouting work was done on the stretch of road. By 1968, the rest of the present roadway was constructed, although the routing was still somewhat off. By 1973, most of the road had been reconstructed along the current routing. The entire length of the highway has been paved since.

Major junctions

References

Roads in Texas
Transportation in Tarrant County, Texas